Cicindela bianconii is a species of ground beetle.

References

bianconii